Allare Allari is a 2006 Indian Telugu romantic comedy film starring Venu Thottempudi, Allari Naresh, Parvati Melton, Mallika Kapoor.

Plot
Ramulamma kills two of the three people who have murdered her husband. She takes a promise from Bapineedu, her younger brother, that her daughter Priya should be taken care of and marry Anand and that her nephew Anand has to study well. The Kurnool district magistrate court awards a lifetime punishment to her.

Anand studies medicine and becomes a cardiologist. He stays in a flat at Brindavan Apartments. The daughter of Sutti Velu attempts suicide and gets admitted in Anand's hospital. Anand learns that she is pregnant and was deceived by a guy whose marriage is taking place on that day. Anand sees to it that the guy marries Velu's daughter in the registrar's office on the same day. Swapna demands Anand to pay seven lakhs as her marriage got cancelled due to Anand. Swapna and her father takes a flat on rent in the apartments where Dr. Anand resides. On one occasion, Anand sees Swapna in her bathroom. Swapna's father and other residents in that apartment demands that Anand marry Swapna. Anand tells to them about the promise his father made to Ramulamma. He agrees to marry Swathi through registered marriage.

Veera Babu works as a watchman in Brindavan Apartments. Anand treats him as a good friend. At the scheduled time, Anand had to attend an emergency case and hence could not turn up at the registrar's office. About the same time, Anand receives a phone call from Bapi Reddy that Anand has to receive Ramulamma at the Central Jail as she is getting released. Anand goes to the registrar office in search of Swapna and finds Veera Babu there. Both Anand and Veera Raju go to central jail to receive Ramulamma. As Veera Babu is in a well-tailored costly suit, Ramulamma believes that Veera Babu is her nephew. A few twists and turns lead to Anand marrying Swapna with Veera Babu marrying Priya with the approval of Ramulamma.

Cast
Venu Thottempudi... Dr. Anand 
Allari Naresh... Veera Babu
Parvati Melton... Swathi
Mallika Kapoor... Priya
Telangana Shakuntala... Pulicherla Ramulamma
Chalapathi Rao... Bapineedu
Jeeva... C. I. Puliraju
Raghu Babu... Paidi Raju
Dharmavarapu Subrahmanyam
M. S. Narayana
Mallikarjuna Rao
Ali
Krishna Bhagavan
Kondavalasa
Giri Babu
Ananth Babu
Gautam Raju

Soundtrack 
The soundtrack was composed by Chakri.
"Laila Laila" - Javed Ali
"Jigi Jigi" - Devan
"Nuvvaina" - Chakri
"Allare" - Karthik
"Hello Killadi" - Raghu Kunche

Reception 
Idlebrain wrote "The movie would have worked if it did not fall flat in the last half an hour". Rediff wrote "all comedy films don't make a fortune at the box office, but the producers try to cash in on the mood of the audience. As a result, sometimes some very insipid comedy films hit the screen. One such endeavour is Allare Allari".

References

External links 
 

2006 films
2006 romantic comedy films
2000s Telugu-language films
Indian romantic comedy films
Films directed by Muppalaneni Shiva